KXLA (channel 44) is an ethnic independent television station licensed to Rancho Palos Verdes, California, United States, serving the Los Angeles area. The station is owned by Rancho Palos Verdes Broadcasters, Inc., whose president and majority owner, Ronald Ulloa, also owns Twentynine Palms–licensed KVMD (channel 31). KXLA's studios are located on Corinth Avenue (near Interstate 405) in West Los Angeles, and its transmitter is located atop Mount Wilson.

Overview
The station first signed on the air in December 2000 as KRPA as an affiliate of America One. The station changed its call letters to KXLA on August 8, 2001, with ethnic programming. The KXLA call sign was previously used by the Pasadena radio station now known as KRDC.

On May 10, 2018, KXLA's main signal was upgraded from 4:3 standard definition (480i) to 16:9 high definition (720p), which allowed local programming and their local newscasts to be broadcast in widescreen.

In popular culture
The KXLA call letters were used in fictional form by the television station featured in the film The China Syndrome and the Bewitched TV spinoff Tabitha, with Lisa Hartman-Black in the title role. The call sign was also used by a radio station in the movie Joe Dirt.

Technical information

Subchannels

KXLA presents seven subchannels on the multiplex shared with KJLA:

Analog-to-digital conversion
KXLA shut down its analog signal, over UHF channel 44, on June 12, 2009, as part of the federally mandated transition from analog to digital television. The station's digital signal remained on its pre-transition UHF channel 51, using PSIP to display KXLA's virtual channel as 44 on digital television receivers.

References

External links

Program Information for KXLA at TitanTV.com

Korean-language television stations
XLA
Italian-language television stations
Japanese-language television stations
XLA
Television channels and stations established in 2000
2000 establishments in California
XLA
LATV affiliates